Sekolah Menengah Sains Hulu Selangor (SEMASHUR) is a Malaysian boarding school located in Hulu Selangor, Selangor. The 60-acre school is located near Hulu Yam, 30 kilometres north of Kuala Lumpur. The school's goal, in line with that of the SBP's, is to achieve academic excellence, in both quantity and quality, in the Hulu Selangor district.

Received Cluster Schools award in 2009 with niche area of rugby, hockey, uniformed bodies and mathematics, SEMASHUR has a good track record when it managed to get number 1 in PMR achievements among SBP schools in 2008 and recorded a hat trick in 2010, 2011 and 2012.

History
SEMASHUR has an area of 60 acres (40 acres of grassy areas and 7 acres of former mining pool). SEMASHUR can be contacted via the River Tua to Batu Caves (25 km) or to a Rawang (30 km) by road Tg. Pilot - KL. SEMASHUR was officially opened on 16 June 2000 as the 38th Sekolah Berasrama Penuh. Pilot line reporting for duty on 20 June 2000 which comprises the Senior Assistant, Senior Assistant Student Affairs (HEM) and 23 teachers to teach the pioneer 150 students. On 21 July 2000, SEMASHUR received a total of 180 students from Form 1. They were the first students of this school. In February 2001, received its first intake SEMASHUR form 4. On 9 April 2009, the school received the Cluster Schools award with niche area of rugby, uniformed bodies and mathematics.

The school basketball team is Blazes Semashur.

Sports
SEMASHUR men basketball team won its first Central Zone Championship in 2005. In 2008, it was rebranded to SEMASHUR Blazes and since then, has achieved glorious success. Men Blazes team have won the Central Zone Championship 6 times in a row (2008-2013) and been to the semi final of the national levels for 5 times in a row (2008-2012). They finished 4th in 2008, 3rd in 2009, 4th in 2010, 2nd in 2011, and 4th in 2012. Semashur Blazes revelation in basketball have been noticeable by national basketball powerhouse such as Mr Liew (MCKK Cagers coach) who recognised Semashur Blazes as a rising force in SBP basketball alongside SainsKu and SDAR. Semashur Blazes close rivals in central zone are INTEGOMB and SSAS while in the national level are MCKK, SAINSKU, SDAR, and MOZAC. The most notable figure in establishing Semashur Blazes success is the team manager, Wan Johari Wan Gati, who left Blazes after the 2012 season came to a close. Notable players include Ibrahim (2001-2005), Haiqal Azree (2004-2008), Afif Ismail (2005-2009), Ruzaini (2006-2010) and Sulaiman 2018-).

SEMASHUR rugby team, Zealord, is also one of top teams in Malaysia which have won numerous championships at national level since the inception of the school. Some of the alumni have joined top rugby clubs after high school and play in the Malaysia Rugby League Premier. yoko

Notable alumni
 Najwan Halimi - Member of the Selangor State Assembly for Kota Anggerik

See also 

 List of schools in Selangor

References

External links
 

Educational institutions established in 2000
2000 establishments in Malaysia
Co-educational boarding schools
Schools in Selangor